Cool Runnings is a 1993 American sports comedy film directed by Jon Turteltaub from a screenplay by Lynn Siefert, Tommy Swerdlow, and Michael Goldberg, and a story by Siefert and Michael Ritchie. It is loosely based on the debut of the Jamaican national bobsleigh team at the 1988 Winter Olympics, and stars John Candy, Leon Robinson, Doug E. Doug, Rawle D. Lewis, and Malik Yoba. In the film, former Olympian Irving Blitzer (Candy) coaches a novice four-man bobsleigh team from Jamaica, led by sprinter Derice Bannock (Robinson). 

Originally envisaged as a sports drama, Jeremiah S. Chechik and Brian Gibson were attached to direct before dropping out, causing Turteltaub to be hired. Robinson was cast in 1989, followed by Doug and Yoba a year later. Lewis, who had little acting experience prior to the film and was first sought as a dialect coach, joined in November 1992. Principal photography began in February 1993 and lasted until that March, with filming locations including Kingston, Discovery Bay, and Calgary. Cool Runnings is Candy's final film released in his lifetime, while its score was composed by Hans Zimmer.

Cool Runnings was theatrically released in the United States on October 1, 1993, by Buena Vista Pictures. It received positive reviews from critics, with praise for its humor, tone, and cast performances. The film grossed $154.9 million worldwide and its theme song, "I Can See Clearly Now" by Jimmy Cliff, reached number 18 on the US Billboard Hot 100.

Plot
In November 1987, Jamaican sprinter Derice Bannock trains to qualify for the 100 metres in the 1988 Summer Olympics. He fails to qualify when fellow runner Junior Bevil accidentally stumbles, not only falling over himself, but knocking down Derice, and another competitor named Yul Brenner.
 
Derice petitions for a re-heat, but committee leader Barrington Coolidge, though he pities Derice, refuses. He invites Derice to try again in four years' time, or to try out for one of the only two other sports Jamaica competes in; boxing and cycling. Derice spots a photograph in Coolidge’s office, featuring his late father Ben, standing next to a fellow Olympic gold medal winner. Coolidge identifies the man as disgraced American bobsled medallist Irving Blitzer, who was disqualified for cheating in the 1972 Winter Olympics, and now works as a bookie, fortunately not far from where Derice lives. Derice realizes he could participate in the 1988 Winter Olympics by forming a bobsled team, recruiting his friend Sanka Coffie, a pushcart derby champion.
 
Derice and Sanka track down Blitzer, who at first refuses to help Derice, until learning he is Ben Bannock’s son. He reluctantly agrees to coach the team. A recruitment drive fails miserably. Blitzer shows a film about bobsledding on a slide projector, but is heckled, and when the lights come on, only Derice and Sanka are still present. Fortunately, Junior Bevil and Yul Brenner arrive late to the meeting, making the required four-man team. Junior, like Derice, can't wait another four years to enter the Olympics, and Yul Brenner just wants to get off the island. The team train with Blitzer, though Coolidge refuses to fund the $20,000 needed to participate in the Olympics, believing the team's inexperience will bring shame to Jamaica. Derice's attempts to find another sponsor fail miserably. The team are forced to find other ways to earn the money- Sanka tries his hand at busking, with no success.  Yul Brenner holds arm-wrestling contests, and Derice even sets up a kissing booth- these ventures meet with moderate success, but they still haven't anywhere near enough money. In the end, Junior sells his car to finance the trip.

In Calgary, Blitzer registers the team, receiving an old bobsled from his former teammate Roger. The Jamaicans struggle to drive the bobsled and adapt to the cold, though exercise and hard work eventually pays off. Derice begins to copy the techniques of the very efficient Swiss team. The East German team, and their captain, Josef Groole- the current bobsled world record holder- constantly heckle the team during try-outs. Eventually, all the members of the team except Derice get into a bar fight with the East Germans. Derice reprimands them severely.

After weeks of training, the team successfully qualifies for the finals, only to be disqualified by the Olympic committee, as retribution for Blitzer’s prior cheating scandal. Blitzer confronts Kurt Hemphill, his former coach, now a judge in the committee, asking him not to punish the Jamaicans, as they had nothing to do with his cheating scandal. That night, the team are informed that they have been reinstated. On the night the Olympics formally open, Junior’s father arrives to retrieve his son, but Junior stands up to his father, and refuses to go home until after the Olympics.
 
The team’s first day on the track is a disaster, finishing in last place. Sanka disapproves of how Derice is copying the Swiss team’s methods, and encourages the team to 'bobsled Jamaican'. They drastically improve on the second day, finishing in eighth place. During their final race, one of the bobsled’s blades detaches, causing it to flip over and crash. Determined to finish the race, the team pick up their bobsled and carry it across the finish line, earning the applause of the other teams and the spectators, including Junior's father, despite their loss. An epilogue explains the team would return home as heroes, then return to the Winter Olympics four years later to participate as equals.

Cast

Production
According to Leon Robinson, "there were script problems. It wasn't funny enough, the key elements were lacking, and it just wasn't working. It was meant to happen when it happened." Leon, Doug and Yoba confirmed in an interview with Empire that it was originally meant to have been a sports drama film.  The film's working title was Blue Maaga. Before Jon Turteltaub was officially hired, Jeremiah S. Chechik was slated to direct until he moved on to do Benny & Joon (1993) instead. Brian Gibson was also considered to direct, but he dropped out to do What's Love Got to Do with It (1993) instead. Turteltaub used the actual ABC sports footage from the 1988 Olympics and incorporated it into the film.

Casting
According to Robinson, "The script has been following me around for 3 years."  Robinson signed on when Gibson was then the director at the time.  Robinson told The Seattle Times, "I was signed more than a year before we actually started." Doug got involved with the film in 1990: "I found Cool Runnings three years ago, when my agent had it on his desk. I knew about the actual event it's based on, the Jamaican bobsled team that went to the '88 Olympics, and even though it's based pretty loosely I thought it made a great yarn."  At the time of Doug's audition, Chechik was attached as the director. Doug told The Baltimore Sun: "I got the offer to play Sanka, the guy I'd wanted to play from the very beginning."

Lewis had very little experience and was not even allowed to audition at first. He told The Seattle Times, "I was hired to read lines to auditioning actors for just one day. That turned into three weeks. At first they told me they were looking for names, big stars, so I wouldn't be considered, but then they asked me to do a screen test."  He also told The Baltimore Sun, "I came in to this film at first to coach the players in the authentic accents."  Lewis was officially hired in November 1992. When asked by Empire how he got involved with the film, Yoba was introduced to the casting director, Jackie Brown, by "a gentleman by the name of Jamal Joseph."  At the time of Yoba's official casting, Gibson was still slated to direct.  Yoba later told Entertainment Weekly that he wrote the Jamaican bobsled song for his audition. Lewis claimed that the executives at Disney wanted Kurt Russell for the role of Coach Blitzer.  However, John Candy personally insisted on portraying the coach and agreed to take a pay cut to do the movie.  According to Yoba, Scott Glenn was also considered for the role. Cuba Gooding Jr., Jeffrey Wright, and Eriq La Salle were each considered for a role as one of the four Jamaican bobsledders.

Filming locations
The film was shot in Calgary and Jamaica in February and March 1993. The cast and crew filmed in Calgary first, to take advantage of the snow. Then they filmed at the Jamaican parishes of Discovery Bay and Kingston. Dawn Steel was on the set every day in Calgary and Jamaica. According to Robinson, "(Steel) worked on the second unit for a while, and she said 'Never again. I never want to direct.

Music
 
A soundtrack album with 11 tracks was released by Sony in 1993 on cassette and compact disc (Columbia Chaos OK 57553).

In some European countries, the soundtrack album was released by Sony with a 12th (bonus) track being "Rise Above It" performed by Lock Stock and Barrel (Columbia 474840 2).

Reception

Box office
The film had total domestic earnings of $68,856,263 in the United States and Canada, and $86,000,000 internationally (with $416,771 earned in Jamaica), for a total of $154,856,263 worldwide.

Critical response
Cool Runnings received positive reviews, including one from Kevin Thomas of the Los Angeles Times which referred to the film as "a sweet-natured, high-spirited comedy, that rare movie that plays effectively to all ages. Even rarer, it celebrates genuine sportsmanship, placing the emphasis back on how the game is played in the face of the winning-is-everything philosophy that permeates every aspect of contemporary life."

Richard Harrington of The Washington Post wrote  "a wholesome, engaging, frequently hilarious, ultimately inspirational film."

Cool Runnings has received a rating of 76% on Rotten Tomatoes based on 42 reviews. The site's consensus states "Cool Runnings rises above its formulaic sports-movie themes with charming performances, light humor, and uplifting tone." On Metacritic it has a score of 60% based on reviews from 17 critics, indicating "mixed or average reviews". Audiences polled by CinemaScore gave the film a grade A on scale of A to F.

Accolades

The film is recognized by American Film Institute in these lists:
 2006: AFI's 100 Years...100 Cheers – Nominated
 2008: AFI's 10 Top 10:	
 Nominated Sports Film

Historical differences

Competition
Jamaica were disqualified by the International Olympic Committee (IOC) for late entry into the competition, but pressure from several appeals, including from Prince Albert of Monaco (who competed in the event himself) led to the reversal of the decision, as opposed to an appeal by their coach.

Despite being presented as a medal contender and record setters in the film, Jamaica crashed on their third and penultimate scheduled run and struggled consistently in the competition: out of 26 contesants, they finished 24th, 25th, and 26th, with times of 58.04 seconds (24th), 59.37 seconds (25th), and 1:03 minutes (26th), becoming the only four-man team in the competition to post a time over one minute. They finished 26th overall, with a cumulative time of just over 3 minutes after three runs. If they had taken part in the final run, they would have had to complete a world-record shattering time under 48.00 seconds to win a medal.

The film implies Jamaica as the only country from a tropical climate to compete in bobsleigh at the Olympics; while they were the only Carribean country to feature in the four-man competition, Netherlands Antilles and two teams from the U.S. Virgin Islands competed in the 38-team two-man competition, who finished 29th, 35th, and 38th, respectively. Two members of the Jamaican team (Dudley Stokes and Michael White) also competed in the two-man sled competition, completing all four runs and finishing in 30th place; Stokes and White were set to compete in two-man bobsleigh event only, with the four-man team entered to compete after the two-man event had already been completed.

Crash
In the film, the team crashes due to mechanical and structural failures in the front left blade of their bobsleigh on their third and final run. 
In reality, the crash occured on their penultimate run and was deemed to occur due to driver inexperience, excess speed, and regressing the turn too high, which caused the sled to become unstable and top-heavy, leading it to topple onto its left side. 

Real footage of the crash was used in the film but was heavily edited, and none of the characters suffered injuries; Stokes described the run and the crash as "disorienting", failing to recall the incident and only realizing they crashed after his fiberglass helmet sustained friction-burn on the ice. The film depicts the team carrying the sled to the finish line to a slow-building standing ovation: in reality, the team walked next to it and received some sporadic applause.

Home media
On November 11, 1994, the film was released on VHS and LaserDisc by Walt Disney Home Video in the United States. On August 24, 1999, the film was released on DVD by Walt Disney Home Video in the United States in Region 1. On September 1, 2000, the film was released on VHS by Walt Disney Studios in the United Kingdom. On January 22, 2001, the film was released on DVD by Walt Disney Studios in the United Kingdom in Region 2. On March 28, 2017, the film was released on region free Blu-ray as a Disney Movie Club Exclusive title.

The film was made available for streaming on Disney+ on January 1, 2020.

See also

 Tropical nations at the Winter Olympics
 Jamaica national bobsleigh team
 List of comedy films of the 1990s
 Jamaica at the 1988 Winter Olympics
 Eddie the Eagle

References

External links

 
 
 
 

1993 films
1993 comedy films
1990s English-language films
1990s sports comedy films
American films based on actual events
American sports comedy films
Bobsleigh films
Bobsleigh in Jamaica
Comedy films based on actual events
Films about the 1988 Winter Olympics
Films directed by Jon Turteltaub
Films produced by Dawn Steel
Films scored by Hans Zimmer
Films set in 1987
Films set in 1988
Films set in Calgary
Films set in Jamaica
Films shot in Alberta
Films shot in Jamaica
Films with screenplays by Tommy Swerdlow
Sports films based on actual events
Walt Disney Pictures films
1990s American films